Dogwood is the third full-length album by San Diego punk band Dogwood. It was self-recorded and self-released in 1998 and mainly sold by the band at shows or found at the local San Diego music stores Music Trader or Lou's records. The song Preschool days was rerecorded for this release at the suggestion of Warner Bros. records who were courting the band at the time. The tracks Never Die and Suffer were removed from the future rerelease This Is Not A New Album at the request of Tooth & Nail Records.

Track listing
 Firehead 
 Never Die 
 Belligerent Love 
 Steinslinger 
 Old Friends 
 Preschool Days 
 Suffer 
 The Rise & Fall of Belinda & Ivan 
 We Have No Talent 
 What I Should Have Said 
 Abandoned 
 Redefine Defiance 
 Progression

Dogwood (band) albums
1998 albums